The Dolen Omurzakov Stadium is a multi-purpose stadium in Bishkek, Kyrgyzstan.  It is currently used mostly for football matches.  The stadium holds 23,000 and is currently the home ground of the Kyrgyzstan national football team, Dordoi Bishkek and Alga Bishkek. It has previously been known as Spartak Stadium.

International Soccer Matches

References

Athletics (track and field) venues in Kyrgyzstan
Buildings and structures in Bishkek
Football venues in Kyrgyzstan
Multi-purpose stadiums
Krygyzstan
Sports venues completed in 1941